A Certain Rich Man is a 1921 American silent drama film directed by Howard Hickman and starring Carl Gantvoort, Claire Adams and Robert McKim.

Cast
 Carl Gantvoort as Bob Hendricks
 Claire Adams as Molly Culpepper
 Robert McKim as John Barclay
 Jean Hersholt as Adrian Brownwell
 Joseph J. Dowling as Col. Martin Culpepper
 Lydia Knott as John Carclay's Mother
 Frankie Lee as Young Neal Ward
 Mary Jane Irving as Young Janet Barclay
 Harry Lorraine as Gen. Hendricks
 J. Gunnis Davis as Lige Bemis
 Charles Colby as Watts McHurdie
 Walter Perry as Jake Dolan
 Fleming Pitts as Mose
 Grace Pike as Col. Culpepper's Wife
 Eugenia Gilbert as Janet Barclay
 Gordon Dumont as Neal Ward
 Edna Pennington as Mrs. Jane Barclay

References

Bibliography
 Munden, Kenneth White. The American Film Institute Catalog of Motion Pictures Produced in the United States, Part 1. University of California Press, 1997.

External links
 

1921 films
1921 drama films
1920s English-language films
American silent feature films
Silent American drama films
Films directed by Howard Hickman
Films distributed by W. W. Hodkinson Corporation
1920s American films